Miklós Gyulai (born 29 December 1970) is a Hungarian sprinter. He competed in the men's 4 × 100 metres relay at the 2000 Summer Olympics. He also competed in two-man bobsleigh the at the 1994 Winter Olympics.

Sporting career

Track and field

Personal best

Achievements

* In heat (he did not participated in the final)

Bobsleigh

Olympic Games

See also
 List of athletes who competed in both the Summer and Winter Olympic games

References

External links
 

1970 births
Living people
Athletes (track and field) at the 2000 Summer Olympics
Bobsledders at the 1994 Winter Olympics
Hungarian male sprinters
Hungarian male bobsledders
Olympic athletes of Hungary
Olympic bobsledders of Hungary
Place of birth missing (living people)